Martín Morales (born November 30, 1978 in Montevideo, Uruguay) is a footballer currently playing for Cúcuta Deportivo of the Primera División in Colombia. He played as a midfielder.

Teams
  Racing MVD 1997
  Racing Club 1998–1999
  Chacarita Juniors 1999–2000
  Racing MVD 2000
  Progreso 2001
  Alianza UY 2002
  Rivera Livramento 2003
  Deportes Antofagasta 2004
  Deportivo Italmaracaibo 2004
  Colorado Rapids 2005
  Ethnikos Asteras 2005–2006
  Cerrito 2006–2007
  Aiolikos 2007–2008
  Universitario de Sucre 2008-2009
  Deportivo Suchitepéquez 2010
  Heredia Jaguares 2010
  Deportes Quindío 2011
  Cúcuta Deportivo 2012–

External links
 Profile at BDFA 
 

1978 births
Living people
Uruguayan footballers
Uruguayan expatriate footballers
Racing Club de Montevideo players
Racing Club de Avellaneda footballers
Colorado Rapids players
Chacarita Juniors footballers
C.D. Antofagasta footballers
Universitario de Sucre footballers
Sportivo Cerrito players
C.A. Progreso players
Deportes Quindío footballers
Cúcuta Deportivo footballers
Ethnikos Asteras F.C. players
Expatriate footballers in Chile
Expatriate footballers in Bolivia
Expatriate footballers in Colombia
Expatriate footballers in Venezuela
Expatriate footballers in Guatemala
Expatriate footballers in Greece
Expatriate soccer players in the United States
Major League Soccer players
Categoría Primera A players
Footballers from Montevideo
Association football midfielders